Duncan Mercredi (born 1951) is a Cree and Métis poet from Winnipeg, Manitoba.

Mercredi was born in Misipawistik Grand Rapids, Manitoba, where he grew up. At sixteen he moved to Cranberry Portage, Manitoba, where he attended high school and moved to Winnipeg shortly thereafter.

He has written four volumes of poetry. Beginning with Spirit of the Wolf: Raise Your Voice in 1991, his works also includes Dreams of the Wolf in the City, Wolf and Shadows and Duke of Windsor: Wolf Sings the Blues and most recently a career-spanning compilation called mahikan ka onot: The Poetry of Duncan Mercredi. In 2020, he became the second (after Di Brandt) and current Poet Laureate of Winnipeg. In 2021, he won the Manitowapow Award at the Manitoba Book Awards.

References

Writers from Winnipeg
First Nations poets
21st-century Canadian male writers
Living people
1951 births
Poets Laureate of places in Canada